CFR Title 42 - Public Health is one of fifty titles comprising the United States Code of Federal Regulations (CFR). Title 42 is the principal set of rules and regulations issued by federal agencies of the United States regarding public health.

Structure 

The table of contents, as reflected in the e-CFR updated February 19, 2014, is as follows:

References

 42
United States federal health legislation